Sylvia Theresa Walby  (born 16 October 1953) is a British sociologist, currently Professor of Sociology, Director of the Violence and Society Centre at the City University of London. She has an Honorary Doctorate from Queen's University Belfast for distinction in sociology. She is noted for work in the fields of the domestic violence, patriarchy, gender relations in the workplace and globalisation.

Walby is coordinator of the Gender Equality Research Network International (GENIe) the aim of which is to develop, through research, the knowledge base to understand and reduce gender inequality. She is principal Investigator of the Lancaster node of Quing, an Integrated Project funded by the European Union under Framework 6 to investigate gender and citizenship in a multicultural context, 2006–2011, Member of the executive board, and Leader of the strand on Intersectionality. She is also co-organiser of an international network on Gender Globalization and Work Transformation (GLOW).

Walby is the first UNESCO Chair in Gender Research and coordinates the associated UNESCO Chair in Gender Research Group. She was appointed in 2008.

Biography
Walby has been Sociology Professor at the University of Leeds, Professor and Head of Department of Sociology at Bristol University; Reader in Sociology and Director of the Gender Institute at the LSE; Lecturer in Sociology and Director of the Women's Studies Research Centre at Lancaster University; Visiting Associate Professor in Sociology at UCLA and Honorary Visiting Scholar at the Schlesinger Library, Harvard University.  She was the first President of the European Sociological Association and has been Chair of the Women's Studies Network UK.

Her current research is situated within the tension between general social theory and specific forms of inequality, especially gender. Over the years this led her from theories of patriarchy to a current concern to mainstream difference into social theory. She has an interest in economic matters, a fascination with new political forms, and concern with marginalised groups. Today, all of these issues are framed by globalisation, the understanding of which requires new forms of social theory, especially complexity theories.

She was appointed Officer of the Order of the British Empire (OBE) in the 2008 Birthday Honours. In 2017 her contribution to sociology was recognised by Queen's University Belfast who awarded her an Honorary Doctorate in Social Sciences (DSSc).

In 2022, she was elected a Fellow of the British Academy (FBA), the United Kingdom's national academy for the humanities and social sciences.

Works

Social theory, Complexity theory

  A book from a long-term programme of research.
  Paper presented to a conference of the British Sociological Association, University of York, April 2004.
  Paper presented to a conference of the British Sociological Association, University of York, April 2003.
  Pdf.
Response from Sandra Harding (doi: 10.1086/495602). 
Response from Joey Sprague (doi: 10.1086/495603).

Gender, Globalization and Work Transformation
Walby is co-organiser of an international network on Gender Globalization and Work Transformation (GLOW), with members in US, Japan, Germany and UK. Key interests are in the relationship between the new knowledge based economy and new non-standard employment forms in the context of changing forms of regulation and deregulation and globalisation.

  Edited with GLOW.
  Presented to the Economic and Social Research Council (ESRC) seminar 'Work, life and time in the new economy', LSE October 2002.
  Working paper series no. 55.

Gender-based violence
Work for the UN on improving statistics and indicators on violence against women:
  
  
  Invited paper (ref ECE/CES/GE.30/2006/7) for the UNECE's Conference of European Statisticians, Group of Experts on Gender Statisticians, 11–13 September 2006.
 Member of UN Task Force on Violence Against Women, 2006-.
  Home Office research study paper no. 276, based on a consultancy with the Home Office's British Crime Survey.
  
  Pdf. Based on Nuffield Foundation funded work.

Politics in a global era
  Pdf.
Response from Steve Bruce and David Voas (doi: 10.1177/0038038504047184). 

  Pdf.
  Pdf.
  Pdf.

Measuring gender equality
  Pdf. Originally prepared for UNESCO, considering to what extent the Beijing +10 process has led to the improvement of the lives of women.
 Contributed research to EU Presidency (Luxembourg) report on "Beijing+10: Progress Made Within the European Union", 2005 (with Anne-Marie Theisen, Nadine Spoden and Mieke Verloo).
  Working paper series no. 17.
 "Gender, Economic Development, Economic Growth and Democracy", ESRC funded project with Wendy Olsen, 2004–5. 
  
 Fellow of the Royal Statistical Society and member Official Statistics Committee.

ESRC Gender seminars
ESRC funded seminar series, "Gender Mainstreaming" 2003–04. 
  Pdf.
  Pdf.

ESRC funded seminar series, "What is Gender Equality", 2005-07 

  Pdf.
 2006, May. "Indicators and statistics of gender based violence"; co-hosted by Royal Statistical Society, Programme and presentations here.
 2007, April. "Developing indicators and official statistics to monitor the new duty to promote gender equality", Programme and presentations here.

Books

References

External links
 City University of London, People
 Online Articles by Author
 Women and Equality Unit
 Curriculum Vitae
 Review Scout Listing
 UN Presentation on Violence against women and the Millennium Development Goals

1953 births
Living people
Fellows of the Academy of Social Sciences
Academics of Lancaster University
Academics of the London School of Economics
Academics of the University of Bristol
Academics of the University of Leeds
British sociologists
Officers of the Order of the British Empire
British women sociologists
Fellows of the British Academy